The 2016–17 Houston Cougars men's basketball team represented the University of Houston during the 2016–17 NCAA Division I men's basketball season. The Cougars were led by third-year head coach Kelvin Sampson and were members of the American Athletic Conference. The Cougars played their home games at Hofheinz Pavilion. They finished the season 21–11, 12–6 in AAC play to finish in third place. They lost to UConn in the quarterfinals of the AAC tournament. They received an at-large bid to the National Invitation Tournament as a No. 2 seed and lost in the first round to Akron.

Previous season 
The Cougars finished the 2015–16 season with a record of 22–11, 12–6 in AAC play to finish in a tie for third place in conference. They lost in the quarterfinals of the AAC tournament to Tulane. They received a bid to the National Invitation Tournament where they lost to Georgia Tech in the first round.

Offseason

Departures

Incoming Transfers

Class of 2016 signees

Class of 2017 signees

Roster

Schedule and results

|-
!colspan=12 style=| Exhibition

|-
!colspan=12 style=| Non-conference regular season

|-
!colspan=12 style=| AAC regular season

|-
!colspan=12 style=| AAC tournament

|-
!colspan=12 style=| NIT

Source

References

Houston
Houston Cougars men's basketball seasons
Houston
Houston
Houston